The Chief Metropolitan Stipendiary Magistrate, known as Chief Metropolitan Police Magistrate until 1949, and also known as the Chief Metropolitan Magistrate and Chief Magistrate of the Police Courts of the Metropolis, was a senior British magistrate based in London. The most senior metropolitan stipendiary magistrate (full-time magistrates appointed for London and the surrounding counties), the Chief Metropolitan Magistrate had responsibilities for the administration of the London magistrates' courts as well as the appointment of metropolitan stipendiary magistrates. He also had special responsibilities in relation to extradition proceedings. The Chief Metropolitan Magistrate was based at Bow Street Magistrates' Court.

The position was abolished on 31 August 2000 by the Access to Justice Act 1999, which unified the stipendiary bench of England and Wales and renamed stipendiary magistrates to District Judge (Magistrates’ Courts). The position of Chief Metropolitan Magistrate, which had no equivalent outside of London, was replaced with that of Senior District Judge (Chief Magistrate), also known as Chief Magistrate, who has leadership responsibility for all District Judges (Magistrates’ Courts) in England and Wales.

The most famous Chief Metropolitan Magistrate was the novelist Henry Fielding, who founded the Bow Street Runners, London's first intermittently funded, full-time police force.

List of Chief Metropolitan Stipendiary Magistrates 

 1739/1740–1746: Sir Thomas de Veil
 1748–1754: Henry Fielding
 1754–1780: Sir John Fielding
 1780–1793: Sir Sampson Wright
 1793–1800: Sir William Addington
 1800–1806: Sir Richard Ford
 1806–1813: James Read
 1813–1820: Sir Nathaniel Conant
 1820–1821: Sir Robert Baker
 1821–1832: Sir Richard Birnie
 1832–1839: Sir Frederick Adair Roe
 1839–1864: Thomas James Hall
 1864–1876: Sir Thomas Henry
 1876–1890: Sir James Ingham
 1890–1899: Sir John Bridge
 1899–1901: Sir Franklin Lushington
 1901–1913: Sir Albert de Rutzen
 1913: Sir Henry Curtis Bennett
 1913–1920: Sir John Dickinson
 1920–1933: Sir Henry Chartres Biron
 1933–1940: Sir Rollo Frederick Graham-Campbell
 1940–1941: Sir Robert Ernest Dummett
 1941–1948: Sir Bertrand Watson
 1948–1960: Sir Laurence Rivers Dunne
 1960–1967: Sir Robert Henderson Blundell
 1967–1975: Sir Frank Milton
 1975–1978: Sir Kenneth James Priestley Barraclough
 1978–1982: Sir Evelyn Charles Sackville Russell
 1982–1992: Sir David Armand Hopkin
 1992–1997: Sir Peter Gilmour Noto Badge
 1997–2000: Graham Edward Parkinson

References 

 David J. Cox, A Certain Share of Low Cunning: A History of the Bow Street Runners, 1792-1839 (2010)
 Frank Milton, The English Magistracy (1967)
 https://www.judiciary.uk/about-the-judiciary/who-are-the-judiciary/judicial-roles/judges/chief-magistrate/

Judiciary of England and Wales
 
18th-century establishments in England
2000 disestablishments in England